AS Qanono is a football club of New Caledonia, competing in the New Caledonia Super Ligue. Its colors are red and blue.

Stadium

The current the club stadium is the Stade de Hnassé, in the city of Wé, with a capacity for  1680 spectators.

References

Football clubs in New Caledonia